Patricia Jane Staunton  (born 30 November 1946) is an Australian judge and former politician. She was a Labor member of the New South Wales Legislative Council from 1995 to 1997.

Born in Townsville, Queensland, she began her career as a registered nurse, working at Townsville General Hospital and then the Royal Hospital for Women at Paddington in Sydney. She then worked at St. Vincent's Hospital from 1963 to 1969, before leaving for the United Kingdom to study law at the University of London. Staunton graduated in Law in London in 1975 and then undertook post-graduate Bar exams at the Inner Temple, and was called to the Bar of England and Wales in 1976. 
She returned to Australia and was admitted to the Supreme Court of New South Wales as a barrister in 1976, and was in private practice 1976–80. In 1987 she was elected head of the Union of the New South Wales Nurses' Association, and served as Legal Officer (1980–85), Assistant General Secretary (1985–87) and General Secretary (1987–95). She had joined the Labor Party in 1982.

In 1989, Staunton was elected to Sydney City Council, where she served until 1991. In 1995 she was elected to the New South Wales Legislative Council as a Labor member, but resigned to resume her legal career in 1997.

In 1999 she was appointed Chief Magistrate of New South Wales. Staunton also completed a Masters in Criminology at the University of Sydney in 2000. In 2002, Staunton was appointed Deputy President and Judicial Member of the Industrial Court of New South Wales (the NSW Industrial Relations Commission). Staunton retired from the Industrial Court in 2009.

From 2010 until 2012, Staunton was Chair of the Board of Justice Health and Forensic Mental Health Network (NSW).

In January 2013, Staunton was appointed as a part-time Deputy President and Member of the NSW Mental Health Review Tribunal.

In 1995, Staunton was made a Member of the Order of Australia for services to Nursing.

She is the original author (and now co-author) of the book "Law for Nurses and Midwives", currently in its seventh edition.

References

1946 births
Living people
Australian barristers
Australian women nurses
Australian nurses
Alumni of the University of London
Members of the New South Wales Legislative Council
Members of the Order of Australia
People from Townsville
Australian Labor Party members of the Parliament of New South Wales
Women members of the New South Wales Legislative Council